Babadag ( "Father Mountain"), formerly known as Babatag, is a town in Tulcea County, Romania, located on a small lake formed by the river Taița, in the densely wooded highlands of Northern Dobruja. One of the several tombs of Sari Saltik is found in town.

The  is divided only by a strip of marshland from Razim Lake, a broad landlocked sheet of water spilling into the Black Sea.

History

The name of Babadag is connected with 13th century dervish Baba Sari Saltik, who is said to have led a number of Turcomans to Dobruja and to have settled them in this area. The town was first mentioned by Ibn Battuta under the name Baba Saltuk, as the furthermost outpost of the "Turks" (i.e., the Golden Horde).

The town was conquered by Bayezid I, sultan of the Ottoman Empire, in his 1393 Danubian campaign. The construction of a fortress was begun here during the reign of Murad IV, but by 1650 only the fortress's foundation walls and towers were standing. In the 17th century, it occasionally served as the winter headquarters for the Grand Vizier of the Turks during their wars with Russia. The town's location near to the Black Sea made it a target for the Russian navy, the town was bombed by the Russians in 1854 during the Crimean War. In the mid-19th century, Babadag formed part of the region (sanjak) of Silistra within the "Bulgarian Government" (Danube Vilayet). Following the 1877–1878 war between the Ottoman and Russian empires, Babadag became part of independent Romania.

At Babadag, the Romanian Army operates a military training facility. In 2008, United States Army forces started to train at Babadag as part of Romania's integration into NATO. In 2022, units of the 101st Airborne Division (that has returned to Europe for the first time since World War II) have been training at the Babadag base, near the border with Ukraine.

Demographics

In 1900 Babadag population was 3,500. The 2011 census counted 8,940 inhabitants.

Population distribution:
6,267 Romanians (77.64%)
420 Turks (5.2%)
1248 Roma (15.46%)
37 Lipovans (0.45%)
98 Others
84.8% were Romanian Orthodox and 14.2% Muslim.

Economy
Before the First World War, Babadag served as the market for wool and mutton from the Dobruja.

Natives
 Laurențiu Iorga (born 1988), footballer
 Kemal Karpat (1924–2019), historian and professor at the University of Wisconsin–Madison
 Aurel Toma (1911–1980), professional boxer

Notes

References
 .
 .

External links

 Official Site

Towns in Romania
Populated places in Tulcea County
Localities in Northern Dobruja
Place names of Turkish origin in Romania